Infinity Cat Recordings is an independent record label founded in 2002 and based in Nashville, Tennessee. The label has released recordings from artists including JEFF the Brotherhood, Diarrhea Planet, Be Your Own Pet, Ed Schrader's Music Beat, and Daddy Issues. In 2011, the label was highlighted by British publication The Guardian, which wrote "forget the Grand Ole Opry; there are more thrilling new bands in East Nashville than anywhere else on earth [and] so many of their records have been released on the same label, Infinity Cat."
In 2011, Billboard Magazine listed Infinity Cat among the 50 best indie labels in America.

History
Infinity Cat Recordings was created on July 20, 2002 by brothers Jake and Jamin Orrall and their songwriter father Robert Ellis Orrall.  Jake and Jamin were 16 and 14, respectively, when they created the label. The label's first release was a live album called Tusky Mahloo by the brothers' band The Sex, which later turned into JEFF the Brotherhood. Since its inception, the label has released almost 100 albums from bands like JEFF the Brotherhood, Diarrhea Planet, Natural Child, PUJOL, and be your own PET. Infinity Cat has been described as one of the more influential labels in the Nashville rock scene, with Nashville Lifestyles describing the label as "Infinity Cat is to Nashville's garage rock as Sub Pop once was to Seattle's grunge: a label so intertwined with—and accountable for—a hyper-buzzed scene that it's naive to mention one without the other." In their recap of the label's history, the Nashville Scene wrote that "long before Third Man Records opened its doors on Seventh Avenue, Infinity Cat had already become the heart through which Nashville's punk-rock arteries pumped their noisy, vibrant blood — helping make the city synonymous with a raw, restless strain of rock 'n' roll, and doing it on almost no budget."

In 2011, Infinity Cat and JEFF the Brotherhood signed a deal with Warner Music Group. Warner Music A&R representative Ryan Whalley told Billboard Magazine that the deal was "a little different than how we usually work with bands" because the band would "maintain a foot in both Warner and Infinity Cat." In an interview with The Tennessean, Jamin stated that the boys originally had reservations about teaming up with Warner, as they felt that they did not need any help, given their success running Infinity Cat. Ultimately, they decided to sign a deal with Warner that would give them "substantial creative control," as well as wider distribution. According to Robert Ellis Orrall, starting with We Are The Champions, JEFF the Brotherhood releases would receive global distribution from WMG's Alternative Distribution Alliance under the Warner/Independent Label Group umbrella.  Later that year, Infinity Cat was listed as #10 in Billboard Magazine's "Business Biz: 50 Best Indie Labels in America.
Infinity Cat celebrated its 10th anniversary with two concerts on July 20 and 21, 2012. At the July 20 show, Metro Councilman At-Large Ronnie Steine read Resolution No. RS2012-339, which proclaims July 20 to be Infinity Cat Recordings Day in Nashville as "it is fitting and proper that the Metropolitan Council recognizes Infinity Cat Recording on its 10th anniversary as one of Nashville's best independent labels."

Artists
Some of the bands signed to the label include:
Be Your Own Pet
Daddy Issues
Denney & The Jets
Diarrhea Planet
Ed Schrader's Music Beat
Music Band
JEFF the Brotherhood

Visitors' Center
Infinity Cat operates a "Visitors' Center" retail store at their headquarters. The Visitors' Center was opened as "a response to requests from fans who have wanted to stop by when they're in Nashville," and sells recordings, merchandise, and label-related rareties.

Discography

References

Further reading

External links
Official Site

Alternative rock record labels
Indie rock record labels
American independent record labels
Record labels established in 2002
Culture of Nashville, Tennessee
2002 establishments in Tennessee